The canton of Estrées-Saint-Denis is an administrative division of the Oise department, northern France. Its borders were modified at the French canton reorganisation which came into effect in March 2015. Its seat is in Estrées-Saint-Denis.

It consists of the following communes:
 
Antheuil-Portes
Arsy
Avrigny
Bailleul-le-Soc
Baugy
Belloy
Biermont
Blincourt
Boulogne-la-Grasse
Braisnes-sur-Aronde
Canly
Cernoy
Chevrières
Choisy-la-Victoire
Coivrel
Conchy-les-Pots
Coudun
Courcelles-Epayelles
Cressonsacq
Crèvecœur-le-Petit
Cuvilly
Domfront
Dompierre
Épineuse
Estrées-Saint-Denis
Le Fayel
Ferrières
Francières
Le Frestoy-Vaux
Giraumont
Godenvillers
Gournay-sur-Aronde
Grandfresnoy
Grandvillers-aux-Bois
Hainvillers
Hémévillers
Houdancourt
Lataule
Léglantiers
Longueil-Sainte-Marie
Maignelay-Montigny
Margny-sur-Matz
Marquéglise
Ménévillers
Méry-la-Bataille
Monchy-Humières
Montgérain
Montiers
Montmartin
Mortemer
Moyenneville
Moyvillers
Neufvy-sur-Aronde
La Neuville-Roy
La Neuville-sur-Ressons
Orvillers-Sorel
Le Ployron
Pronleroy
Remy
Ressons-sur-Matz
Ricquebourg
Rivecourt
Rouvillers
Royaucourt
Sains-Morainvillers
Saint-Martin-aux-Bois
Tricot
Vignemont
Villers-sur-Coudun
Wacquemoulin
Welles-Pérennes

References

Cantons of Oise